Higgins Restaurant and Bar, or simply Higgins, is a restaurant in Portland, Oregon, in the United States.

Description and history
Nearly one third of its menu was vegetarian when Higgins opened in 1994.

Reception
The restaurant has been called a "Portland landmark". The business was included in Eater Portland's 2022 overview of "Where to Eat and Drink in Downtown Portland".

See also
 James Beard Foundation Award: 2000s

Reception

External links
 
 
 
 
 

1994 establishments in Oregon
Restaurants established in 1994
Restaurants in Portland, Oregon
Southwest Portland, Oregon